Oncorhynchus rastrosus (synonym Smilodonichthys rastrosus) also known as the saber-toothed salmon, or spike-toothed salmon is an extinct species of salmon that lived along the Pacific coast of North America and Japan. They first appeared in the late Miocene in California, then died out some time during the Early Pliocene.

 Members of this species had a pair of small "fangs" protruding from the tip of the snout, thus explaining the common name and synonym. Adults of O. rastrosus had larger gill rakers compared to their smaller, modern relatives, leading scientists to suggest that the adults ate plankton. These salmon are believed to have been anadromous like their living relatives.

Scientists once thought the teeth pointed straight down, like a saber-toothed cats's teeth. Now it is believed the teeth stuck out sideways from the mouth. According to paleontologist Julia Sankey, the salmon did not possess spike teeth throughout its life; the fish developed the teeth as it transitioned from life in the ocean to fresh water. The salmon bred in fresh water, as Pacific salmon do today. Tooth wear patterns suggest the salmon used its teeth to defend territory and mark nests during the breeding phase.

References

Miocene fish
Pliocene fish
Pliocene extinctions
Oncorhynchus
Neogene fish of North America
Fossil taxa described in 1972